SubUrbia is a 1996 American comedy-drama film directed by Richard Linklater and written by Eric Bogosian, based on his play of the same name. It follows the relationships between a few young adults as they spend their time standing on "the corner" outside a local convenience store.

Bogosian based the story on his own experiences growing up in Woburn, Massachusetts, a suburb of Boston. The convenience store setting is based on the 7-Eleven in the "Four Corners" section of the west side of Woburn, and the high-school fight song that is sung in one scene is the actual Woburn High fight song ("Black and Orange" to the tune of "On Wisconsin").

Plot
Three years out of high school in the fictional town of Burnfield (filmed mainly in Austin, Texas), four friends are in the daily habit of hanging out drinking by the garbage dumpster of a corner convenience store, occasionally taunting the foreign-born store owner/operator, married couple Nazeer and Pakeesa. The film's main character, Jeff, is an aimless soul unsure of his future since dropping out of college. Jeff is dating Sooze, a student at the local community college who plans to leave Burnfield and study visual arts in New York City. Jeff's best friends are Buff and Tim. Tim, recently honorably discharged from the Air Force, is a troubled heavy-drinker with a knack for shooting off his mouth. Sooze's friend Bee-Bee is a recovering alcoholic who hangs out with the group one evening.

This particular evening, the group are expecting a visit from a high school friend, Neil "Pony" Moynihan, lead singer for Dreamgirls, an up and coming rock band that is on a stadium tour as the opening act for a major rock band. Dreamgirls performed in Austin that night, but the gang could not afford tickets. Pony arrives with Erica, Dreamgirls' publicist. Erica reveals how excited Pony has been about seeing the gang and most of the group is glad to see him, although some of them are bitter and jealous of his recent success. As the expanded group hangs out beside the store, their actions and conversations show that they all are contemplating what they want to do with the rest of their lives. By the end of the night, Bee-Bee is in medical trouble after drinking an entire bottle of hard liquor.  Buff has slept with Erica and is going to Los Angeles to shoot a Dreamgirl music video.  Sooze has left town with Pony. Tim has been arrested and released, and Jeff is berated by Nazeer for "throw(ing) it all away".

Cast

 Jayce Bartok as Pony
 Amie Carey as Sooze
 Nicky Katt as Tim
 Ajay Naidu as Nazeer
 Parker Posey as Erica
 Giovanni Ribisi as Jeff
 Samia Shoaib as Pakeesa
 Dina Spybey as Bee-Bee
 Steve Zahn as Buff

Actors Samia Shoaib and Steve Zahn reprise their roles from the original stage production (1994) at the Mitzi E. Newhouse Theater. In the stage play, the character of Nazeer was named Norman.

Soundtrack

In addition to existing songs by various artists heard during the film, Sonic Youth composed and performed new songs for the film. The film's score was composed by Stewart Copeland.

 "Unheard Music" – Elastica & Stephen Malkmus
 "Bee-Bee's Song" – Sonic Youth
 "Bulletproof Cupid" – Girls Against Boys
 "Feather in Your Cap" – Beck
 "Berry Meditation" – U.N.K.L.E.
 "I'm Not Like Everybody Else" – Boss Hog
 "Cult" – Skinny Puppy
 "Does Your Hometown Care?" – Superchunk
 "Sunday" – Sonic Youth
 "Human Cannonball" – Butthole Surfers
 "Tabla in Suburbia" – Sonic Youth
 "Hot Day" – The Flaming Lips
 "Psychic Hearts" – Thurston Moore
 "Town Without Pity" – Gene Pitney

Reception
The film earned a ranking of 68% on Rotten Tomatoes from 25 reviews. The site's consensus states: "SubUrbia succeeds in its blistering, ensemble-driven exploration of middle America, though it never quite reconciles the disparate stylings of director Richard Linklater and writer Eric Bogosian." Roger Ebert gave the film a positive review giving the film 3 stars out of 4, calling it "dark, intense and disturbing".

Awards
Ajay Naidu was nominated for Best Supporting Male at the 1997 Independent Spirit Awards but lost to Jason Lee.

References

External links
 
 
 

1996 films
1996 comedy-drama films
1996 independent films
American comedy-drama films
1990s English-language films
Films directed by Richard Linklater
American films based on plays
Films scored by Stewart Copeland
Films set in Austin, Texas
Films shot in Austin, Texas
Castle Rock Entertainment films
Sony Pictures Classics films
1990s American films